Howell may refer to:

Places

In the United Kingdom 
Howell, Lincolnshire, England

In the United States 
Howell, Georgia
Howell, Evansville, a neighborhood of Evansville, Indiana
Howell, Michigan
Howell, Missouri
Howell, Utah
Howell County, Missouri
Howell High School (Howell, Michigan)
Howell High School (New Jersey)
Howell Mountain, California
Howell Mountain AVA, an American Viticultural Area in Napa County, California
Howell Township (disambiguation), several places

Business establishments
Böwe Bell & Howell, American manufacturer and supplier of media technologies
Howells (department store), large department store in Cardiff, Wales, established by James Howell
Howell, Soskin, a defunct American publisher acquired by Crown Books
John Howell & Son, British building and engineering company

Other uses
Howell (name), a surname and given name
Howell torpedo, an early type of U.S. Navy torpedo
Howell, a table movement system used in duplicate bridge (see Duplicate bridge#Table movements)
Hugh Howell Road, Georgia

See also
Howells (disambiguation)
 Justice Howell (disambiguation)